Kim Hyok-chol (Korean: 김혁철, born 1971) is a North Korean diplomat. Kim is the first ambassador in Spain, however, he was expelled in 2017.

Early life and education
Kim was born in Pyongyang and studied French at the Pyongyang University of Foreign Studies.

Career
From 2000 until 2012 Kim was the DPRK ambassador for Ethiopia in Addis Ababa and, since 2011, also for South Sudan in Juba.

On October 1, 2013, Kim became the first DPRK ambassador in Spain when his country opened its new embassy in Madrid. In September 2017 he was expelled as a persona non grata after a North Korean nuclear weapon's test on September 3, 2017. The Madrid embassy was later raided by members of Free Joseon on February 22, 2019, just prior to the 2019 North Korea–United States Hanoi Summit.

Replacing Choe Son-hui, the Vice Foreign Minister, Kim became the chief nuclear negotiator of the DPRK in February 2019. As the counterpart to Stephen E. Biegun, the American envoy, Kim participated in the Hanoi Summit on February 27 and 28 that was abruptly terminated.

In May 2019 the South Korean newspaper The Chosun Ilbo claimed that, in the aftermath of the failed Hanoi summit, Kim Hyok-chol and another four officials had been executed at Mirim Airport, Sadong-guyok, Pyongyang in March 2019. It was also indicated that some other participants, among them Kim Yong-chol, were sent to reeducation camps. The report remained unconfirmed and unsupported by other sources. In early June, state media of the DPRK published a photo of Kim Yong-chol at a public event with Kim Jong-un and CNN indicated, based on multiple sources, that Kim Hyok-chol was alive and in custody.

References

North Korean diplomats
Ambassadors of North Korea to Spain
21st-century North Korean people
People from Pyongyang
1971 births
Possibly living people